The 1803 Connecticut gubernatorial election took place on April 14, 1803. Incumbent Federalist Governor Jonathan Trumbull Jr. won re-election to a sixth full term, defeating Democratic-Republican candidate Ephraim Kirby in a re-match of the previous year's election.

Results

References 

Gubernatorial
Connecticut
1803